Creighton is a city in Cass County, Missouri, United States. The population was 327 at the 2020 census. It is 57 miles south southeast of the Kansas City metropolitan area.

Community 

 Public education in Creighton is administered by the Sherwood Cass R-VIII School District, which operates one elementary school, one middle school, and Sherwood High School. All three schools share 1 facility, located on the North side of MO-7 Highway across from downtown Creighton.
 Creighton maintains one USPS full service location as well as a City Hall building for public works and city documents.
 The compact, rural hub has been home to a number of small businesses for well over a century. The oldest continually operating business is Sherwood Community Bank, and it was originally incorporated in 1902 as Farmer's & Merchant's (of Creighton).

History
Creighton was platted in 1855, and named after John B. Creighton, a pioneer citizen. A post office called Creighton has been in operation since 1887.

Geography
Creighton is located at  (38.495498, -94.073148).

Demographics

2020 census
As of the census of 2020, there were 327 people, 139 households, and 94 families living in the city. The racial makeup of the city was 91.7% White, 1.2% African American, .6% Native Hawaiian or Pacific Islander,1.7% Native American, and 5.5% from two or more races. Hispanic or Latino of any race were 3.9% of the population.

There were 139 households, of which 20.9% had children under the age of 18 living with them, 38.1% were married couples living together, 30.2% had a female householder with no husband present, 19.4% had a male householder with no wife present, and 12.3% were non-families. 29.6% of all households were made up of individuals, and 11.3% had someone living alone who was 65 years of age or older. The average household size was 2.46 and the average family size was 3.02.

The median age in the city was 35.2 years. 20.9% of residents were under the age of 18; 13.3% were between the ages of 18 and 24; 14.6% were from 25 to 44; 26.9% were from 45 to 64; and 14.7% were 65 years of age or older. The gender makeup of the city was 46.4% male and 53.6% female.

2010 census
As of the census of 2010, there were 349 people, 142 households, and 94 families living in the city. The racial makeup of the city was 95.7% White, 2.0% African American, 1.7% Native American, and 0.6% from two or more races. Hispanic or Latino of any race were 2.0% of the population.
			
There were 142 households, of which 35.9% had children under the age of 18 living with them, 47.9% were married couples living together, 9.9% had a female householder with no husband present, 8.5% had a male householder with no wife present, and 33.8% were non-families. 29.6% of all households were made up of individuals, and 11.3% had someone living alone who was 65 years of age or older. The average household size was 2.46 and the average family size was 3.02.
	
The median age in the city was 33.9 years. 25.8% of residents were under the age of 18; 9.5% were between the ages of 18 and 24; 26.6% were from 25 to 44; 25.2% were from 45 to 64; and 12.9% were 65 years of age or older. The gender makeup of the city was 48.7% male and 51.3% female.

2000 census
As of the census of 2000, there were 322 people, 128 households, and 83 families living in the city. The population density was 1,086.7 people per square mile (414.4/km2). There were 138 housing units at an average density of 465.7 per square mile (177.6/km2). The racial makeup of the city was 98.76% White, 0.31% from other races, and 0.93% from two or more races. Hispanic or Latino of any race were 0.62% of the population.

There were 128 households, out of which 38.3% had children under the age of 18 living with them, 53.1% were married couples living together, 8.6% had a female householder with no husband present, and 34.4% were non-families. 31.3% of all households were made up of individuals, and 17.2% had someone living alone who was 65 years of age or older. The average household size was 2.52 and the average family size was 3.17.

In the city the population was spread out, with 31.1% under the age of 18, 5.9% from 18 to 24, 32.3% from 25 to 44, 16.8% from 45 to 64, and 14.0% who were 65 years of age or older. The median age was 35 years. For every 100 females, there were 105.1 males. For every 100 females age 18 and over, there were 101.8 males.

The median income for a household in the city was $41,071, and the median income for a family was $48,750. Males had a median income of $41,000 versus $19,479 for females. The per capita income for the city was $20,369. About 8.9% of families and 12.9% of the population were below the poverty line, including 11.7% of those under age 18 and 19.5% of those age 65 or over.

References

External links
 Historic maps of Creighton in the Sanborn Maps of Missouri Collection at the University of Missouri

Cities in Cass County, Missouri
Cities in Missouri